The 14th Indian Division was formed during World War I, for service in the Mesopotamian Campaign. It was composed of battalions of the Regular British Army, the British Territorial Force and the British Indian Army.

History

The Division now part of the Tigris Corps was involved in a number on minor engagements the Second Battle of Kut and the Fall of Baghdad, the Division's 36th Brigade was left in Baghdad as the Garrison.

The Division remained in Mesopotamia until the Armistice of Mudros 31 October 1918.

Order of battle
The division commanded the following units, although not all of them served at the same time:

35th Indian Brigade
 1/5th Battalion, Buffs (East Kent Regiment)
 37th Dogras
 102nd King Edward's Own Grenadiers
 2nd Battalion, 4th Gurkha Rifles

36th Indian Brigade
Departed for the North Persia Force in June 1918, replaced by 56th Indian Brigade
 1/4th Battalion, Hampshire Regiment
 26th Punjabis
 62nd Punjabis
 82nd Punjabis

37th Indian Brigade
 1st Battalion, 2nd King Edward's Own Gurkha Rifles (The Sirmoor Rifles)
 36th Sikhs
 64th Pioneers
 1/4th Battalion, Devonshire Regiment
 45th Rattray's Sikhs
 2nd Battalion, Norfolk Regiment
 2nd Battalion, 9th Gurkha Rifles
 1st Battalion, 67th Punjabis
 82nd Punjabis
 185th Machine Gun Company
 37th Light Trench Mortar Battery

56th Indian Brigade
Joined in August 1918 to replace 36th Indian Brigade
 1/4th Battalion, Prince Albert's (Somerset Light Infantry)
 1st Battalion, 42nd Deoli Regiment
 95th Russell's Infantry
 104th Wellesley's Rifles
 1st Patiala Lancers (attached March to June 1918)
 2nd Indian Machine Gun Company
 56th Light Trench Mortar Battery

Artillery
13th Brigade Royal Field Artillery
C/69th Howitzer battery

Battles

Advance to the Hai and capture of the Khudaira Bend. 14 December 1916.
Capture of the Hai Salient. 25 January – 5 February 1917.
Capture of Sannaiyat. 17–24 February 1917.
Second Battle of Kut. 23 February 1917
Passage of the Tigris. 23–24 February 1917.
Fall of Baghdad (1917). 8–11 March 1917
Passage of the ‘Adhaim. 18 April 1917.
Action of the Shatt al Adhaim. 30 April 1917.
Second action of Jabal Hamrin. 16–20 October 1917.
Third action of Jabal Hamrin. 3–6 December 1917.

See also

 List of Indian divisions in World War I

Notes

References

Bibliography

External links

British Indian Army divisions
Indian World War I divisions
Military units and formations established in 1916
Military units and formations disestablished in 1919